The 2000 Copa Libertadores Final was a two-legged football match-up to determine the 2000 Copa Libertadores champion. It was contested by Argentine club Boca Juniors and Brazilian club Palmeiras. The first leg of the tie was played on 14 June at Boca Juniors' venue, La Bombonera, with the second leg played on 21 June at Estádio do Morumbi in São Paulo.

After both matches finished tied, Boca Juniors won the Cup by penalty shoot-out.

Qualified teams

Venues

Route to the finals

Final summary

First leg

|

|}

Second leg

References

l
l
2000
Football in Buenos Aires
l
Sociedade Esportiva Palmeiras matches
Copa Libertadores Finals 2000